Curtis Justin Solar Jr. (born September 26, 1992) is an American country music singer-songwriter from Baton Rouge, Louisiana. As a musician, Solar has cited Southern rock acts such as Lynyrd Skynyrd and Creedence Clearwater Revival as influences, along with grunge bands of the 1990s such as Nirvana, Stone Temple Pilots, and Soundgarden. As a songwriter, Solar had a #1 hit as a co-writer on Morgan Wallen's "Up Down".  He has written songs for Jason Aldean, Jerrod Niemann, Justin Moore, and others. As an artist, Solar was named by Rolling Stone as a "New Artist you Need To Know" and has opened for acts such as Lynyrd Skynyrd, .38 Special, Gary Allan, Chris Janson,  and Hank Williams Jr.

Personal life 
Solar graduated from Belmont University in 2014 with a degree in songwriting.  Prior to graduating he signed a publishing deal with Sea Gayle Music Publishing, a publishing company co-owned by Brad Paisley and Chris Dubois.

References

External links 
 

Living people
1993 births
American country singer-songwriters
Musicians from Baton Rouge, Louisiana
Country musicians from Louisiana
Singer-songwriters from Louisiana